Critically Ashamed is the second studio album by the pop punk band FM Static.

Track listing

Personnel 

 Trevor McNevan – vocals, guitar, guitar recording, art direction
 Steve Augustine – drums
 FM Static – producer, additional engineering
 Mike Noack  – engineering
 Zack Hodges  – engineering
 JR McNeely – mixing
 Brian Gardner  – mastering
 Aaron Powell – guitar recording
 Randy Torres – guitar recording
 Emmanuel Brown – bass guitar recording
 Mike Noack – keyboards
 Jamie K – additional guitars and engineering on "Six Candles"
 Brandon Ebel – A&R
 Jeff Carver – A&R
 Jason Powers – design
 Dave Hill – photography

Charts

References

External links
 E-Card

2006 albums
Tooth & Nail Records albums
FM Static albums